Hans-Dieter Pophal (born 22 November 1937) is a retired German diver. He competed in the springboard at the 1960 and 1964 Summer Olympics and finished in eighth and fourth place, respectively. 

Pophal dominated the 3 m springboard event in the 1960s in Germany, winning all national titles in 1958 and 1960–1967; he also won a silver medal at the 1962 European Aquatics Championships.

He returned to competitions in the 1990s, winning world titles in the 1 m and 3 m springboard in the masters category in 1994; he also finished second in the 10 m platform.

He is a son in law of Olga Jensch-Jordan, who competed in the springboard at the 1932 and 1936 Olympics.

References

1937 births
Living people
German male divers
Olympic divers of the United Team of Germany
Divers at the 1960 Summer Olympics
Divers at the 1964 Summer Olympics
Divers from Berlin
20th-century German people